The 1999 MicronPC.com Bowl was a post-season American college football bowl game at Pro Player Stadium in Miami Gardens, Florida, between the Illinois Fighting Illini and the Virginia Cavaliers on December 30, 1999. This was the tenth edition of what had originally been the Blockbuster Bowl, and second year of sponsorship by MicronPC.

The game was the final contest of the 1999 NCAA Division I-A football season for both teams, and ended in a 63–21 victory for Illinois.  Illinois and Virginia had previously met in the postseason at the 1990 Florida Citrus Bowl, also won by Illinois, 31–21.

Game summary 
The Illini took advantage of the school's first bowl appearance in five years with an impressive 63–21 victory over highly touted running back Thomas Jones and the Virginia Cavaliers. In a game which pitted two evenly matched, 7–4 squads, the Illini dominated with 611 yards total offense and nine touchdowns. On the first drive of the game, Kurt Kittner led the Illini down field 71 yards and scored on a one-yard run. The Illini then rattled off 35 unanswered points, including a flea-flicker pass from wide receiver Brandon Lloyd to Kittner for 30 yards and a halftime score of 42–7. Kittner threw a school record 24th touchdown pass on a one-yard reception to Jameel Cook. The Illini broke 22 Illinois and Micronpc.com Bowl records that night and scored the second-most points in collegiate bowl history.

Scoring summary

Statistical summary
Team Statistics

(Rushing-Passing-Total): UI - 325-286-611; UVA - 172-208-380.

Individual Statistical Leaders

Rushing (Att.-Yds.-TD): UI—Harvey 10-122-2; Havard  15-75-2; Kittner 4-11-1; Johnson 3-5-1; UVA—Jones 23-110-1.

Passing (Att.-Comp.-Int.-TD-Yds.): UI—Kittner 24-14-1-2-254; UVA - Ellis 32-15-1-1-146.

Receiving (No.-Yds.-TD): UI—Cook 4-88-2, Lloyd 3-57-0, Dean 2-42-0, Young 1-31-0, Kittner 1-30-1; UVA—Jones 5-31-0, McMullen 3-31-0.

References

MicronPC.com Bowl
Cheez-It Bowl
Illinois Fighting Illini football bowl games
Virginia Cavaliers football bowl games
Sports competitions in Miami Gardens, Florida
MicronPC.com Bowl
December 1999 sports events in the United States